The Community High School District 218 is a public high school district with offices in Oak Lawn, Illinois.  As of 2017–18, there are 5,405 students enrolled in three high schools and an alternative high school. The district also owns two learning centers. The district superintendent is Ty Harding.

Schools and Learning Centers
 Dwight D. Eisenhower High
 Harold L. Richards High School
 Alan B. Shepard High School
Aspen Alternative High School
Delta Learning Center
Summit Learning Center

Feeder school districts
Feeder districts include:
 Ridgeland School District 122
 Oak Lawn-Hometown School District 123
 Atwood Heights School District 125
 Alsip, Hazelgreen, Oak Lawn School District 126
 Worth School District 127
 Chicago Ridge School District 127.5
 Palos Heights District 128
 Cook County School District 130 	
 Calumet Public School District 132
 Midlothian School District 143
 Posen-Robbins School District 143½

References

External links

 District Website

School districts in Cook County, Illinois
Oak Lawn, Illinois